Haxhi Et'hem Bey also known as Haxhi Et'hem bey Mollaj (1783–1846) was an Ottoman Albanian administrator, nobleman and bejtexhi.

Et'hem Bey was the son of Molla Bey of Petrela, from one of the prominent families of the Tirana area, back then part of the Ottoman Albania. He is descendant of Sulejman Pasha Bargjini, who gave the main contribution to the development of Tirana as a commercial and religious center. His family was an opponent of the powerful Toptani family and with connected to the Bushatlliu family of Shkodra. As a result, Abdyl Rahman Toptani exiled him away from Tirana. He would reconcile later with the Ottoman rulers by joining the Ottoman campaign against Mustafa Pasha Bushati in 1831.

Etëhem Bey finished in 1819 or 1821 the Ethem Bey Mosque in the main square of Tirana, which bears his name. The mosque was started by his father Molla Bey between 1791-1794. 
He was buried in Ethem Bey Mosque, next to his wife Balkis.

Etëhem Bey was also a diwan poet. He wrote both in Turkish and Albanian. His work in Turkish consists of 4 diwans. In Albanian he wrote a Bektashi mystical poem and a diwan, out of which nothing has survived. For the Turkish work, he used the pen-name "Shehidi" (the Martyr).

References

18th-century Albanian people
19th-century Albanian people
1783 births
1846 deaths
Albanian Muslims
Albanian-language poets
Turkish-language poets
People from Tirana
Sanjak of Scutari
Albanians from the Ottoman Empire
Divan poets from the Ottoman Empire
18th-century Albanian poets
19th-century Albanian poets
Bektashi Order
Albanian Sufis
Albanian male poets
18th-century male writers